May Arkwright Hutton (July 21, 1860 – October 6, 1915) was a suffrage leader and labor rights advocate in the early history of the Pacific Northwest of the United States.

Biography
May Arkwright Hutton, who has been described as an orphan by some sources, is now often believed to have been illegitimate.  She was raised by her paternal grandfather, Aza, in Washingtonville, Ohio. Aza, who was blind, enjoyed political meetings and May often accompanied him.

In 1883, she moved to Idaho, where she owned and operated a boarding house in Kellogg.  In 1887, she married Levi "Al" Hutton, one of her customers. They moved to Wallace, Idaho where she oversaw the dining hall of the Wallace Hotel and her husband worked for the Northern Pacific Railroad. May and Al were part of a group of miners that struck it rich when discovering a vast silver mine. When miners dynamited the Bunker Hill and Sullivan's mine concentrator in Wardner, Idaho, Al was the engineer of the train used to deliver the dynamite.

Al was arrested in connection to the destruction of the Bunker Hill and Sullivan's mine concentrator, and held in a stockade known as the "bull pen". He was soon released, but May continued to write letters to Governor Steunenberg of Idaho and to newspapers in the name of the Western Federation of Miners. She accused the Governor of taking bribes of up to $50,000 and being a traitor to the union cause.   

In 1897, the Huttons, invested in the  successful Hercules silver mine
 
Hutton was a candidate for the Idaho State Senate in 1904, but was defeated.

The last year of her life, she was ill with Bright's disease. She was known to travel in her chauffeured Thomas Flyer to farm communities, meeting farmers and trying to make matches to keep single mothers and their children together. 

In her memory, Al started the Hutton Settlement orphanage in the Spokane Valley.

Labor activism
Both Hutton and her husband were active in the associated labor movements. She wrote a book about the horrible treatment of the miners at the hands of the mine owners, and the treatment of her husband at the hands of the sheriff/mine owners in her book The Coeur d'Alenes: or, A tale of the modern inquisition in Idaho. In later life, she bought all of the copies she could back. Hutton also supported an eight-hour work day and six-day workweek for women.

Suffrage movement
She was a supporter of the women's suffrage movement in Idaho.

In 1906, the Huttons moved to Spokane, Washington. She became a member of the Spokane Equal Suffrage Club and first vice-president of the Washington Equal Suffrage Association, which was then led by Emma Smith DeVoe. She became a well-known suffrage leader, but her outspoken style and unconventional behavior contrasted sharply with that of the more moderate Emma Smith DeVoe, a national suffrage organizer who was active in Tacoma, Olympia and Seattle.  There was a great deal of conflict between the two, but they achieved their goal in 1910.  

Hutton attended the Democratic National Convention in 1912.

Notes

External links

May Arkwright Hutton clip from "Courage in Corsets" PBS 

1860 births
1915 deaths
People from Spokane, Washington
American suffragists
People from Kellogg, Idaho
Idaho Democrats
Washington (state) Democrats